Poschiavino is an  long river that rises in the Swiss canton of Graubünden and flows into the Italian province of  Sondrio. The majority of the river is in Switzerland, with just  in Italy.

Below the lake, the river passes the settlements of Brusio and Campocologno before crossing the border into Italy.

The water of the river and its tributaries is used to power several hydro-electric plants owned by Repower AG.

References

Rivers of Switzerland
Val Poschiavo
Rivers of the Province of Sondrio
Rivers of Graubünden
Rivers of Italy
Poschiavo